John M. Mason may refer to:

 John M. Mason (musician) (1940–2011), Scottish solicitor, musician, composer and conductor
 John M. Mason (theologian) (1770–1829), American preacher and theologian
 John Monck Mason (1726–1809), Irish politician and literary scholar

See also
John Mason (disambiguation)